Relations between the European Union (EU) and the United Kingdom of Great Britain and Northern Ireland (UK) are governed, since 1 January 2021, by the EU–UK Trade and Cooperation Agreement (TCA). 

Relations trace back to the foundation of the European Communities, the European Union's predecessor, in 1957. The UK was a member state of the bloc after joining it in 1973 (which was confirmed in a referendum on membership in 1975) until it became the first country to voluntarily end its membership on 31 January 2020 after a second referendum on membership was held in 2016 which resulted in 51.9% of voters opting to leave.

The Brexit withdrawal agreement now plays a significant role in relations between the two polities. The United Kingdom shares a land border with the Republic of Ireland, an EU member state, via Northern Ireland, which has remained a de facto member of the European Single Market and maintained the authority of the European Court of Justice under the Northern Ireland Protocol. While relations between the UK and the EU have seen improvement since the proposal of the Windsor Framework, relations have been generally poor since the initial Brexit vote.

History

Precedents 

The UK failed to take part in the diplomatic discussions that led up to the creation of the European Coal and Steel Community (ECSC), likewise later withdrawing from negotiations for the constitution of the European Economic Community (EEC).

The United Kingdom's failed applications to join the European Communities (EC) in 1963 and 1967 were vetoed by the president of France, Charles de Gaulle, who said that "a number of aspects of Britain's economy, from working practices to agriculture" had "made Britain incompatible with Europe" and that Britain harboured a "deep-seated hostility" to any pan-European project. Once de Gaulle had relinquished the French presidency in 1969, the UK made a third and successful application for membership.

UK membership in the bloc (1973–2020) 

Following the UK accession to the EC in 1973, the former got to renegotiate membership terms, vied for budgetary rebates and requested opt-outs from the single currency and other common policies. The protectionist Common Agricultural Policy (CAP) in particular was often at the centre of the UK conflicts with the rest of the EC, underpinning its reputation as an "awkward partner" within the bloc.

Since 1977, both pro- and anti-European views have had majority support at different times, with some dramatic swings between the two camps. Conservative and Labour parties alike usually pandered to the prejudices towards the EC espoused by the Britons, who rather than commit to a European idea, generally preferred to hanker for the bygone days of British world hegemony. In the United Kingdom European Communities membership referendum of 1975, two-thirds of British voters favoured continued EC membership. The highest-ever rejection of membership was in 1980, the first full year of Prime Minister Margaret Thatcher's term of office, with 65% opposed to and 26% in favour of membership. As a member of the EU, the United Kingdom never adopted the use of the euro or joined the Schengen Area, which, bringing down border controls in a number of countries, thereby allowed for free movement of citizens. Likewise, the UK government adhered to a long-standing policy of enthusiasm for EU enlargement, under the premise that the addition of more members would undermine any federalising drive (deepening) of the union.

Vis-à-vis Gibraltar, a British Overseas Territory whose defence and foreign policies are handled by His Majesty's Government, the Spain's accession to the European Communities in 1986, negotiated with the UK inside the bloc from a position of strength, made the former country to renounce its power, recognised by the Treaty of Utrecht, to close its land border with Gibraltar at its discretion. The then Conservative UK government acquiesced to the 1992 Maastricht Treaty (by which the European Union came into existence) as it aligned with its vision of the bloc as essentially a free market.

The 1998 Good Friday Agreement pertaining the end of the ethnonationalist conflict in Northern Ireland was signed under the context of the shared membership of the UK and Ireland in the EU.

Following the result of the 2016 United Kingdom European Union membership referendum, when 52 percent of those who voted supported 'Brexit' (a portmanteau of "British exit"), the UK negotiated its withdrawal from the European Union. After the vote, British Prime Minister David Cameron, who supported staying in the EU, resigned. Theresa May became the prime minister after his formal resignation. Although she also supported remaining in the EU, she committed to negotiating Britain's exit. The United Kingdom formally left the bloc on 31 January 2020.

Post-Brexit relations (since 2020) 

On 30 December 2020, after eight months of negotiations, the EU and the UK signed the EU–UK Trade and Cooperation Agreement, which governs bilateral relations since its provisional entry into force two days later and which was later ratified by both parties. The UK government attempts to reject the terms of the agreed Northern Ireland Protocol have proven a thorn in Post-Brexit relations.

Although the United Kingdom maintained strong relations with some EU member states, the decision to withdraw sparked criticism of the United Kingdom across the union and especially in the German press. However, the British response to the 2022 Russian invasion of Ukraine is thought to have "restored relations to pre-Brexit levels".

Post-Brexit Polling 

Following the UK's withdrawal from the EU, polling companies have continued to poll respondents on re-joining the EU.

National Polling 
Respondents are regularly polled on their voting intention in a hypothetical referendum on re-joining the EU. This is instead of re-using the leave/ remain question from the 2016 referendum.

Recent polling results have demonstrated a clear lead for "re-join" over "stay[ing] out". A longer example of the following table can be found here.

In the European Union 
In 2021, Euronews commissioned British pollsters Redfield & Wilton Strategies to conduct a poll in France, Germany, Spain, and Italy on how respondents would feel about the UK re-joining the EU. Support out-weighed opposition across all four countries, with it being lowest in France (36%) and highest in Spain (46%).

Trade 
In 2017, exports to the European Union amounted to £274 billion out of £616 billion in total exports for the UK. The proportion of UK export to the European Union has been noted to be in decline, since exports to non-EU countries have increased at a faster rate.

On the European side, according to Eurostat, exports from the EU 27 to the UK have increased from 316 euro billions in 2015 to 319 euro billions in 2019.
In the same time, according to Eurostat, imports from the UK to the EU-27 have increased from 184 euro billions in 2015 to 194 euro billions in 2019.

United Kingdom's foreign relations with EU member states (EU27)

See also 

 Cyprus dispute 
 European Union–NATO relations
 Foreign relations of the European Union
 Foreign relations of the United Kingdom
 Gibraltar–Spain border 
 Greenland–European Union relations 
 Iceland–European Union relations
 Ireland–NATO relations
 Liechtenstein–European Union relations
 Malta–NATO relations
 Norway–European Union relations
 Opinion polling on the United Kingdom rejoining the European Union (2020–present)
 Opinion polling on the United Kingdom's membership of the European Union (2016–2020)
 Post-Brexit United Kingdom relations with the European Union
 Republic of Ireland–United Kingdom border

References 

European Union
Contemplated enlargements of the European Union